The 121st Anti-aircraft Artillery Regiment "Ravenna" is an anti-aircraft artillery regiment of the Italian Army. Originally founded as a field artillery regiment the unit transferred to the anti-aircraft specialty on 15 June 1953. Today the regiment is based in Bologna and Rimini in the Emilia-Romagna and administratively assigned to the Anti-aircraft Artillery Command.

Current Structure
As of 2022 the 121st Anti-aircraft Artillery Regiment "Ravenna" consists of:

  Regimental Command, in Bologna
 Command and Logistic Support Battery
 1st Anti-aircraft Group
 1st Battery (Stinger)
 2nd Battery (Stinger)
 3rd Battery (Skyguard "Aspide")
 Fire Control and Support Battery

The Command and Logistic Support Battery fields the following sections: C3 Section, Transport and Materiel Section, Medical Section, and Commissariat Section. The Anti-aircraft Group's Skyguard "Aspide" surface-to-air missile systems will be replaced with CAMM-ER systems in the near future.

External links
Italian Army Website: 121° Reggimento Artiglieria Controaerei "Ravenna"

References

Artillery Regiments of Italy